Neil John Mustoe (born 5 November 1976) is an English former footballer who played as a midfielder. He last played for Conference North side Gloucester City. He first signed for City at the start of the 2002–03 season but left in January 2003 to join Stevenage Borough, and soon afterwards, Yeovil Town. He re-signed for the club in August 2003.

Born in Gloucester, Mustoe signed for Manchester United on leaving school in 1993 and subsequently earned Schoolboy International honours. He won the FA Youth Cup in 1995 while at Old Trafford, and became a professional soon afterwards, but Alex Ferguson never selected him for a first-team game and he joined Wigan Athletic in December 1997, later turning out for Cambridge United for four seasons, but was released in summer 2002 as part of cost-cutting measures following the ITV Digital collapse.

He became joint-caretaker manager of non-league Gloucester City, with Adie Harris, on 5 January 2006 following the resignation of Chris Burns until the appointment of Tim Harris from Merthyr Tydfil on 11 January 2006.

Mustoe captained his home town club to win the Southern Football League play-offs with a 1–0 win over Farnborough Town to earn promotion to the Conference North in May 2009. For the 2010–11 season Mustoe was appointed first-team coach, a position he held in addition to his playing duties.

On 21 December 2021, Mustoe was announced as interim manager of Hellenic League side Tuffley Rovers.

Honours

Club
 FA Youth Cup: 1994–95

Individual
 Cambridge United Player of the Year: 1998–99

References

External links

Tiger Roar: Neil Mustoe

1976 births
Living people
Footballers from Gloucester
English footballers
England youth international footballers
Association football midfielders
Manchester United F.C. players
Wigan Athletic F.C. players
Cambridge United F.C. players
Gloucester City A.F.C. players
Stevenage F.C. players
Yeovil Town F.C. players
English Football League players
Southern Football League players
National League (English football) players
English football managers
Gloucester City A.F.C. managers